Eastern Heights may refer to:

 Eastern Heights, Monroe County, Indiana
 Eastern Heights, Queensland
 Eastern Heights (Tampa), a neighborhood within the City of Tampa, Florida, United States